Mariama Ouiminga (born 24 January 1970) is a Burkinabé sprinter. She competed in the women's 100 metres at the 1988 Summer Olympics. She was the first woman to represent Burkina Faso at the Olympics.

References

External links
 

1970 births
Living people
Athletes (track and field) at the 1988 Summer Olympics
Burkinabé female sprinters
Olympic athletes of Burkina Faso
Place of birth missing (living people)
Olympic female sprinters
21st-century Burkinabé people